Conrad Brooks (born Conrad Biedrzycki; January 3, 1931 – December 6, 2017) was an American actor. He was known for his many appearances in the 1950s films of cult director Ed Wood.

Career
Conrad Brooks was born January 3, 1931 in Baltimore, Maryland, the son of Polish immigrants, Victor and Katherine Biedrzycki. His father was a baker. Conrad was one of eight children. 

Brooks moved to Hollywood, California in 1948 at age 17, along with his brothers Harry and Ted, attempting to break into acting. Brooks first encountered the legendary filmmaker Ed Wood in a donut shop, and eagerly agreed to appear in a short western film Wood was planning to direct. Brooks entered show business by acting in such Ed Wood cult classics as Plan 9 from Outer Space, Glen or Glenda, Bride of the Monster, Night of the Ghouls, The Sinister Urge and Jail Bait. He appeared in more Ed wood films than any other actor in fact. He also appeared briefly as an airplane pilot in The Beast of Yucca Flats (1961).  

Brooks took a break from acting during the 1960s and 1970s, but due to the later revived interest in the films of Ed Wood, he re-emerged in the 1980s and became a prolific actor in low-budget films. He even went on to write, produce and direct several films.

Along with Gregory Walcott and Paul Marco, Brooks appeared briefly in Tim Burton's film Ed Wood, playing a bartender. Brooks was a frequent guest at the Mid-Atlantic Nostalgia Convention and I-Con at Stony Brook University, where he signed autographs for his fans. 

He made a cameo appearance as the pianist for the Sound The Surrender music video by heavy metal band, Darkest Hour. When The Sinister Urge episode of Mystery Science Theater 3000 was released on DVD, Brooks filmed a special introduction. Brooks was interviewed in two documentaries about Ed Wood, Flying Saucers Over Hollywood: The Plan 9 Companion (1992) and The Haunted World of Edward D. Wood Jr. (1995).

Brooks teamed up again with filmmaker Jonathan M. Parisen on two films, Toilet Gator and Space Vampires from the Planet Blood, and a television show, Blast Corrigan: Rocketship To Earth.

Brooks was founder and owner of Conrad Brooks Productions, which has produced the Gypsy Vampire series, starring Bruce "Porkchop" Lindsay as Count Lugo, as well as the "Jan-Gel" film trilogy.

Brooks continued acting well into his 80s, making an appearance in a 2015 remake of Plan 9 from Outer Space. He made his last appearance in the 2016 film Don't Let the Devil in.

Brooks was married to Ruth Marilyn Biedrzycki (December 21, 1923 - April 8, 2016) from the late 1960s until her death. They had one daughter.

Death
Brooks, who suffered from prostate cancer, died of complications from sepsis on December 6, 2017 in Martinsburg, West Virginia, at age 86.

Selected filmography

Jalopy (1953) as Party Guest (uncredited)
Glen or Glenda (1953) as Banker / Reporter / Pickup Artist / Bearded Drag
Clipped Wings (1953) as Recruit (uncredited)
Jail Bait (1954) as Medical Attendant / Photographer (uncredited)
The Mad Magician (1954) as Bonfire Extra (uncredited)
Bride of the Monster (1955) as Suspect Outside Office (uncredited)
Plan 9 from Outer Space (1959) as Policeman
The Sinister Urge (1960) as Connie
Night of the Ghouls (1959) as man in Fight (uncredited)
Mystery in Shadows (1960, Short, Director, Producer, Writer) as Bob Ryan
Bob and Run (1960, TV Movie) as Bob
The Beast of Yucca Flats (1961) as man at Airfield
Girl Madness (1961)
Hellborn (1961)
The Young and the Immoral (1961)
A Polish Vampire in Burbank (1983) as Bartender
Deathrow Gameshow (1987) as Judge
Curse of the Queerwolf (1988) as Wally Beaver
Young Rebels (1989) as Drug Boss
On the Trail of Ed Wood (1990, Documentary) as himself
F.A.R.T. the Movie (1991) as Game Show Panelist
Shadow of the Dragon (1992) as Officer Singer
Flying Saucers Over Hollywood: The Plan 9 Companion (1992, Documentary) as himself
Hellborn (1993, Writer) as himself / Connie
Test Tube Teens from the Year 2000 (1994) as Janitor
Ed Wood: Look Back In Angora (1994, Documentary) as himself
Ed Wood (1994) as Bartender
Conrad Brooks vs. the Werewolf (1994, Short) as himself
Baby Ghost (1995) as Elliot
The Haunted World of Edward D. Wood Jr. (1995) as	Himself
Bikini Drive-In (1996) as Oscar
Misfit Patrol (1996) as Officer Buford Murphy
Toad Warrior (1996) as Swamp Farmer
The Saturn Avenger Vs. the Terror Robot (1996, Short) as Doc
Shotgun Boulevard (1996) as Rinaldi
Rollergator (1996) as Swamp Farmer
Blood Slaves of the Vampire Werewolf (1996, Director) as Monk
Snuff Films: An Exposé (1996, Short) as himself
Guns of El Chupacabra (1997) as Deputy Reins
Dalziel and Pascoe: Deadheads (1997, TV Series) (uncredited)
The Ironbound Vampire (1997) as Ambrose
Ice Scream (1997) as Ricky
Alien Agenda: Under the Skin (1997) as Sal Pantangilo (segment "Unsavory Characters")
I Woke Up Early the Day I Died (1998) as Cruiser Cop #3
Hollywood Mortuary (1998) as himself
Creaturealm: From the Dead (1998) as himself (segment "Hollywood Mortuary")
Armageddon Boulevard (1999) as Godfather Rinaldi
The Atomic Space Bug (1999) as Mr. Donaldson
Silent Scream (1999) as Silent Screen Villain
The Beast of Retro City (1999)
Ghost Taxi (1999)
Jan-Gel, the Beast from the East (1999, Director, Producer, Writer) as himself
Transylvania Police; Monster Squad (2000)
The Vampire Hunters Club (2001, Video short) as Conrad
The Monster Man (2001) as Lord Gideon
El Cerebro de Hitler! (2001) as Babbling Drunkard
Max Hell Frog Warrior (2002) as Swamp Farmer
Raising Dead (2002) as Police Chief Arbogast
Pacino Is Missing (2002) as Blind Camera Operator
Bikini Planet (2002) as Vice-President
Attack of the Giant Gull (2002)
Zombiegeddon (2003) as Dean Martinson
Minds of Terror (2003) as Doctor
Jan-Gel 3: Hillbilly Monster (2003, Director, Executive Producer) as Dirty Harry
Corpses Are Forever (2004) as Mr. Fairbrass
Dr. Horror's Erotic House of Idiots (2004) as Conrad Andrews
Brain Robbers From Outer Space (2004) as Officer Jamey
Super Hero Central (2004) as Laslo Mauser
Bob's Night Out (2004) as Crazy Cop
Gypsy Vampire (2005, Director) as Cap
That's Independent! (2004, Documentary) as himself
The Demon Monster from Outer Space (2005)
2020 An American Nightmare (2005, Executive Producer) as Dad
9mm Sunrise (2006) as Mr. Rinaldi
Purvos (2006) as Professor Jessup
Zeppo: Sinners from Beyond the Moon! (2007) as Dept of Defense chief Brooks
Vampira: The Movie (2007, Consultant)
Gypsy Vampire 2 - Gypsy Vampire's Revenge (2007, Director)
Blast Corrigan: Rocketship To Earth (2008)
Toilet Gator (2008)
Freaky Vampire (2008, Director)
A Taste of Desperation (2009) as The Landlord
It Came from Trafalgar (2009) as Wid Hawk
Shadows In The Woods (2009, Co-Director)
Space Vampires From The Planet Blood (2009)
Beside the Manor Selby (2010) as The Gardener
Zombie on the Loose (2010, Director)
The Girl (2011) as Elderly Gentleman
Invasion of the Reptoids (2011) as Elderly Gentleman
Terror of The Giant Tentacle (2013)
Psychotic State (2014) as Grandpa
Plan 9 (2015) as Jamie
Bite School (2015) as Conrad
Pitfire of Hell (2016) as UFO Spotter
Killer Waves (2016) as Marvin
Subconscious Reality (2016) as The Seer
Don't Let the Devil In (2016) as Mr. Taylor
Toilet Gator (2017) as Walter Vonleer
Abaddon (2018) as Hippie
Midnight Massacre (2018) as Grandfather Anthony
Ghost of El Chupacabra (2019)

References

External links

1931 births
2017 deaths
American male film actors
Deaths from sepsis
Male actors from Maryland
20th-century American male actors
21st-century American male actors